Randsfjord Station was a railway station at located on the west bank of the south of the lake of Randsfjorden in Jevnaker, Norway. Passengers could transfer to steam ship for transport on Randsfjorden.

History
The station was opened in 1868 when it became the northern terminus of Randsfjorden Line. In 1909, the Bergen Line was completed along with Roa–Hønefoss Line, that on the east side of Randselva built Jevnaker Station about one kilometer from Randsfjord Station. Since the through trains between Oslo and Bergen went through Jevnaker, and it was better located to Hadeland Glassverk and the sawmills, Jevnaker took most of the traffic.

Passenger traffic to Randsfjord station was terminated on May 26, 1968; 100 years after the opening of the line. Since January 1, 1981 there has been no traffic on the line between Bergermoen and Randsfjord, with the tracks being removed in 1984.

Railway stations in Oppland
Railway stations on the Randsfjorden Line
Railway stations opened in 1868
Railway stations closed in 1968
1868 establishments in Norway